Rodrigo Zalazar Martínez (born 12 August 1999) is a Uruguayan professional footballer who plays as a midfielder for Bundesliga club Schalke 04.

Club career
Raised through the youth academies of Albacete and Málaga, Zalazar signed a four-year contract with Bundesliga club Eintracht Frankfurt on 2 July 2019. Three days after joining Eintracht Frankfurt, Ekstraklasa side Korona Kielce signed him on a one-year loan deal for 2019–20 season. He made his professional debut on 20 July 2019, coming on as a 70th minute substitute for Erik Pačinda in a 1–0 league win against Raków Częstochowa.

On 6 August 2020, 2. Bundesliga club FC St. Pauli announced the signing of Zalazar on a season-long loan deal.

On 4 August 2021, Zalazar agreed to join Schalke 04 on a season-long loan with an option to make the move permanent until 2026. On 25 March 2022, Schalke exercised this option.

International career
Born in Spain to Uruguayan parents, Zalazar was eligible to represent both Uruguay and Spain at international level. Following his father's footsteps, he chose to play for Uruguay. He was included in Fabián Coito's Uruguay under-20 squad for 2019 South American U-20 Championship in January 2019. He played seven matches in the tournament, helping his team to finish third.

Personal life
Rodrigo is son of former Uruguay international footballer José Zalazar, and the younger brother of former Spanish youth international Kuki Zalazar. He was born in Albacete while his father was a player of the local club Albacete Balompié.

Career statistics

Honours
Schalke 04
2. Bundesliga: 2021–22

References

External links
 Profile at the FC Schalke 04 website
 

1999 births
Living people
Spanish people of Uruguayan descent
Sportspeople of Uruguayan descent
Association football midfielders
Spanish footballers
Uruguayan footballers
Uruguay youth international footballers
Ekstraklasa players
Bundesliga players
2. Bundesliga players
Korona Kielce players
FC St. Pauli players
FC Schalke 04 players
Uruguayan expatriate footballers
Uruguayan expatriate sportspeople in Poland
Uruguayan expatriate sportspeople in Germany
Expatriate footballers in Poland
Expatriate footballers in Germany
Sportspeople from Albacete
Footballers from Castilla–La Mancha
People with acquired Uruguayan citizenship